The 12th Filipino Academy of Movie Arts and Sciences Awards Night was presented by the Filipino Academy of Movie Arts and Sciences in 1964 honoring the outstanding achievements of Filipino films for the year 1963.

Sapagkat Kami'y Tao Lamang was the most nominated film of the 12th FAMAS Awards with 10 nominations and won 7 awards including the best actor award for Eddie Rodriguez.  However, it failed to win the most coveted award and that is the FAMAS Award for Best Picture which goes to Sigaw Ng Digmaan a war movie which starred Fernando Poe Jr.

Awards

Major Awards
Winners are listed first and highlighted with boldface.

Special Awardee

Dr. Ciriaco Santiago Memorial Award 
Eddie Romero (for "Cavalry Command")

References

External links
FAMAS Awards 

FAMAS Award
FAMAS
FAMAS